The 2008 SEC women's basketball tournament was held on March 6–9, 2008 in Nashville, TN at the Sommet Center.

Tennessee won the tournament and received the SEC's automatic bid to the 2008 NCAA tournament.

Tournament

Asterisk denotes game ended in overtime.

All-Tournament team 
Sylvia Fowles, C, LSU
Quianna Chaney, G, LSU
DeWanna Bonner, G, Auburn
Shannon Bobbitt, G, Tennessee
Candace Parker, F, Tennessee (MVP)

References

SEC women's basketball tournament
+
Basketball competitions in Nashville, Tennessee
Women's sports in Tennessee
College sports tournaments in Tennessee
2008 in sports in Tennessee